The city of Calgary is located in Alberta, Canada and has over one million inhabitants. Tourism is an important part of the economy.

List of attractions

Downtown

Northwest

Northeast

Southwest

Southeast

See also
Tourism in Alberta
Tourism in Canada
List of places of worship in Calgary

References

External links
Places to see in Calgary 
Calgary Attractions - Travel Alberta
Museums in Calgary - Alberta Heritage

 
Tourist attractions in Calgary
Calgary
Calgary-related lists